La Delatora is a 1955 Argentine crime film directed by Kurt Land.

Cast

 Arturo Arcari
 Alberto Bacigaluppi
 Virgilio Barbatti
 Alberto Bello
 Amalia Bernabé
 Luis Boldoni
 Susana Campos
 Domingo Carlos
 Carlos D'Agostino
 Carlos Estrada
 Víctor Ferreyra
 Carmen Giménez
 Francisco Lizzio
 Diana Maggi
 Víctor Martucci
 Lautaro Murúa
 Miguel A. Olmos
 Nathán Pinzón
 Julio Portela
 Georges Rivière
 Fada Santoro
 Jaime Saslavsky
 Osvaldo Terranova
 Félix Tortorelli
 Luis Veilat
 Enrique Waiss

References

External links
On YouTube

1955 films
1950s Spanish-language films
Argentine black-and-white films
Films directed by Kurt Land
Argentine crime films
1955 crime films
1950s Argentine films